Boissard is a surname. Notable people with the surname include:

Adéodat Boissard (1870–1938), French politician
Jean-Jacques Boissard (1528–1602), French antiquary and poet
José Miguel Boissard (born 1978), Dominican judoka

See also
 Boisard